The 1993 Melbourne Cup was a two-mile handicap horse race which took place on Tuesday, 2 November 1993.

The race was won by Irish horse Vintage Crop becoming the first European Horse to win the race. His win the Melbourne Cup was put on the international map. Vintage Crop had won Curragh Cup and Irish St. Leger before Weld took Vintage Crop to Australia and try and win first up. The Flemington Racecourse was soaked by overnight rain and Vintage Crop at 14/1 defeated outsiders Te Aku Nick and Mercator.

Field 

This is a list of horses which ran in the 1993 Melbourne Cup.

References

1993
Melbourne Cup
Melbourne Cup
1990s in Melbourne